The Shuttle Training Aircraft (STA) was a NASA training vehicle that duplicated the Space Shuttle's approach profile and handling qualities, allowing Space Shuttle pilots to simulate Shuttle landings under controlled conditions before attempting the task on board the orbiter. The STA was also flown to assess weather conditions just prior to Space Shuttle launches and landings.

Development
NASA developed the STA using the Grumman Gulfstream II as the underlying aircraft platform. During the early phases of the Shuttle program, NASA considered using the Boeing 737 airliner as the basis for the STA, but rejected it due to cost and opted for the less-expensive Gulfstream II.

The aircraft's exterior was modified to withstand the high aerodynamic forces incurred during training sorties. A redesigned cockpit provided a high-fidelity simulation of the Shuttle Orbiter's controls and pilot vantage point; even the seats were fitted in the same position as those in the Space Shuttle.

Operational history

The four STAs were normally located at the NASA Forward Operating Location in El Paso, Texas and rotated through Ellington Field (Houston, Texas) for maintenance. The STA was also used at Kennedy Space Center in Florida. It was primarily flown by astronauts practicing landings at the Shuttle Landing Facility and White Sands Space Harbor as well as to assess weather conditions prior to Space Shuttle launches and landings.

On December 3, 2003, a NASA Gulfstream II Shuttle Training Aircraft (STA) was flying a series of simulated shuttle landings to the Kennedy Space Center shuttle landing facility. On board the aircraft was an unidentified NASA astronaut pilot and two training personnel. The aircraft was on final approach at 13,000 feet when onboard instruments indicated a malfunction on one of the jet engine thrust reversers. The aircraft landed safely. A post-landing inspection showed that one of the 585-pound, 4-foot-wide, 5-foot-long thrust reversers had fallen off the aircraft. Divers later found the thrust reverser on the bottom of the nearby Banana River. An investigation showed that a bolt failed, releasing the part from the aircraft.

Flight profile
The STA was particularly critical for Shuttle pilots in training because the Orbiter lacked atmospheric engines that would allow the craft to "go around" after a poor approach. After re-entry, the Shuttle was a very heavy glider (it was affectionately referred to as a 'flying brick') and as such had only one chance to land successfully.

Its flaps could deflect upwards to decrease lift as well as downwards to increase lift.

Covers were placed on the left hand cockpit windows to provide the same view as from a Shuttle cockpit, and the left-hand pilot's seat was fitted with the same controls as a Shuttle. The STA's normal flight controls were moved to the right, where the instructor sat. Both seat positions had a head-up display (HUD).

The outer glide slope aiming point was  short of the runway threshold, and used PAPIs for visual guidance in addition to the MLS system. The nose gear of the STA was lowered at  AGL in case of an inadvertent touchdown with the runway surface.

This was the exact position that the pilot's head would be in during an actual landing. The instructor pilot deselected the simulation mode, stowed the thrust reversers, and the instructor executed a go-around, never actually landing the aircraft (on training approaches).

Avionics

A sophisticated computer system installed on board the STA simulated the flight dynamics of the orbiter with nearly perfect accuracy. The STA's highly realistic simulation of the orbiter was not limited to handling characteristics, but also implemented the shuttle control interfaces for the pilot.

An onboard computer called the Advanced Digital Avionics System (ADAS) controlled the Direct Lift Control (DLC) and the in-flight reverse thrust during Simulation Mode.

Every shuttle commander practiced at least 1,000 landings in this manner, as had each mission's shuttle pilot.

List of aircraft
Four Gulfstream II aircraft constituted the now retired STA fleet, although other Gulfstream II aircraft, lacking STA capabilities, are still used by NASA for personnel transport purposes. Although the majority of the fleet had markings similar to those pictured above, paint schemes do vary slightly across aircraft.

On August 22, 2011, NASA announced that all four Shuttle Training Aircraft would be retired at various NASA facilities around the country, with N944 retiring at the Dryden Flight Research Center.

The STA tail numbers were:
 NASA 944: N944NA (s/n 144)
 NASA 945: N945NA (s/n 118) — On July 13, 2017, a ribbon cutting ceremony was conducted and this aircraft is now in permanent display at the U.S. Space & Rocket Center in Huntsville, Alabama.
 NASA 946: N946NA (s/n 146) — On September 21, 2011, this aircraft became a permanent display at the Texas Air & Space Museum in Amarillo, Texas.
 NASA 947: N947NA (s/n 147) — Currently on permanent display at the Evergreen Aviation & Space Museum in McMinnville, Oregon.

See also

 Shuttle Mission Simulator
 List of spaceflight-related accidents and incidents

References

External links

Space Shuttle program
1980s United States special-purpose aircraft
Gulfstream aircraft
NASA aircraft
T-tail aircraft
Aircraft related to spaceflight